Triton Babies Fountain is a fountain and sculpture by Anna Coleman Ladd, installed in Boston's Public Garden, in the U.S. state of Massachusetts. It features a bronze sculpture, cast in 1922, that depicts a boy and girl and measures approximately 2 ft. 3 in. x 19 in. x 39 in. The statue rests on a granite base measuring approximately 2 ft. 6 in. x 18 in. x 31 in. The work was surveyed as part of the Smithsonian Institution's "Save Outdoor Sculpture!" program in 1993.

A contemporary news item refers to the sculpture, a gift from Mrs. Boylston Beal, as "two Cupids, about life size".

References

External links

 

1922 establishments in Massachusetts
1922 sculptures
Boston Public Garden
Bronze sculptures in Massachusetts
Fountains in Massachusetts
Granite sculptures in Massachusetts
Outdoor sculptures in Boston
Sculptures of children in the United States
Statues in Boston